Harringtonia is a genus of longhorn beetles of the subfamily Lamiinae.

 Harringtonia dalmeidai (Dillon & Dillon, 1946)
 Harringtonia myia (Dillon & Dillon, 1946)

References

Calliini
Beetles described in 1946